The International Standard Version or ISV is a English translation of the Bible for which translation was complete and published electronically in 2011.

The texts of the Dead Sea Scrolls have been used to provide a textual apparatus for understanding the Old Testament.

Characteristics

Translation
The translation aims to be central between a literal translation and an idiomatic translation, a philosophy the ISV translation team call "literal-idiomatic" (p. xliii of the ISV Introduction). A distinctive feature of the ISV is that biblical poetry is translated into English metrical rhyme.

Release numbers
The Holy Bible: International Standard Version (ISV) is being produced with identifying release numbers and build sequence identifiers so as to provide tracking of improvements and additions to the text. The current release is Release 2.0. According to the ISV foundation website, a 3.0 build is not expected to be completed until 2021 at the earliest.

See also
List of Bible translations
List of English Bible translations
English translations of the Bible
Modern English Bible translations

References

External links

 Official website

2011 books
Bible translations into English